Yrjö Halonen (23 May 1862 – 11 August 1941) was a Finnish cantor, bank director and politician, born in Kestilä. He was a member of the Diet of Finland from 1897 to 1905 and of the Parliament of Finland from 1908 to 1909 and again from 1913 to 1916, representing the Finnish Party.

References

1862 births
1941 deaths
People from Siikalatva
People from Oulu Province (Grand Duchy of Finland)
Finnish Party politicians
Members of the Diet of Finland
Members of the Parliament of Finland (1908–09)
Members of the Parliament of Finland (1913–16)